Haseeb-ur-Rehman (born 3 November 1992) is a Pakistani cricketer. He made his first-class debut for Agriculture Development Bank of Pakistan in the 2013–14 President's Trophy Grade-I tournament on 31 October 2013.

References

External links
 

1992 births
Living people
Pakistani cricketers
Zarai Taraqiati Bank Limited cricketers
Place of birth missing (living people)